The ACC Fast Track Countries Tournament was a three-day cricket tournament run by the Asian Cricket Council (ACC), contested between its top-ranking ICC associate members. It was played three times between 2004 and 2006, and then replaced by the ACC Twenty20 Cup. Some matches in the second edition of the tournament held first-class status, as they were simultaneously ICC Intercontinental Cup matches.

2004/05 tournament 

Hong Kong, the UAE and Nepal all qualified for the 2005 ICC Intercontinental Cup as a result of their top three finish in the tournament. A separate final was originally set to be held, but as Hong Kong and the UAE topped the group with only their group match to take place, it was decided to make the final group match the overall tournament final. The UAE beat Hong Kong by five wickets in that final.

2005/06 tournament 

Matches in this tournament between Hong Kong, Nepal and the UAE also counted towards the 2005 ICC Intercontinental Cup.

2006/07 tournament

See also 

 ACC Premier League
 ACC Championship
 ACC Trophy
 ACC Twenty20 Cup

References

External links 
2004/05 tournament official site
2005/06 tournament official site
2006/07 tournament official site

Asian Cricket Council competitions
ACC Trophy
Recurring sporting events established in 2004
2004 establishments in Asia
Recurring sporting events disestablished in 2007
2007 disestablishments in Asia